Vulelua (also Neal Island) is an island in the Solomon Islands; it is located in Guadalcanal Province. There is a hotel in the island.

References

Islands of the Solomon Islands